The Durand Express was a weekly newspaper published in Durand, Michigan from 1888 until 2003.

It was owned by a number of different individuals until being sold to the Argus-Press of Owosso, Michigan.

References

Newspapers published in Michigan